Furstner, Fürstner, or Fuerstner may refer to:

Adolph Fürstner (1833–1908), German publisher
Alois Fürstner (b. 1962), Austrian chemist
Karl Fürstner (1848–1906), German neurologist and psychiatrist
Johan Furstner (1887–1970), Dutch naval officer and politician
Stephan Fürstner (b. 1987), German professional footballer 
Wolfgang Fürstner (1896–1936), German Army officer